Stakes Races held at Pimlico Race Course,  each year in Baltimore, Maryland.

Pimlico Race Course